The name Claudia has been used for five tropical cyclones in the Eastern Pacific Ocean:
 Tropical Storm Claudia (1962), crossed over the western portion of the Baja California peninsula, moved over water, and again struck the peninsula before dissipating
 Tropical Storm Claudia (1965), never affected land
 Tropical Storm Claudia (1969), downgraded to a depression only 24 hours after first becoming a tropical storm; did not make landfall
 Tropical Storm Claudia (1973), made landfall approximately 30 mi (50 km) east of Acapulco; no deaths or casualties were reported
 Hurricane Claudia (1977), did not make a landfall

The name Claudia has also been used three times in the Australian region:
 Cyclone Claudia (1982)
 Cyclone Claudia (2002) (14P), did not make a landfall
Cyclone Claudia (2020), brought heavy rainfall to Darwin

The name Claudia also was used to name a storm in the South-West Indian Ocean basin:
 Tropical Cyclone Claudia (2012), did not make a landfall

Pacific hurricane set index articles
Australian region cyclone set index articles
South-West Indian Ocean cyclone set index articles